WPXO-LD, virtual channel 34 (VHF digital channel 4), is a low-powered América TeVé-affiliated television station licensed to East Orange, New Jersey, United States, and serving the New York City television market. The station is owned by Caribevision Holdings, Inc. WPXO-LD's transmitter is located at the Empire State Building.

History
WPXO originally began as a 24-hour music channel called The Box on channel 23 with the call letters W23BA. In 1996, the station was sold to Paxson Communications from Craig L. Fox, which made it a translator for its station in Bridgeport, Connecticut, WHAI-TV. After Paxson acquired WPXN-TV to serve as its New York outlet, the company sold off the Bridgeport station (which has since become WZME) and made W23BA a translator of WPXN. The following year, due to potential future interference from WHSI-TV (now WFTY-DT), who was assigned channel 23 for its digital signal, it moved to channel 34.

On September 11, 2001, the transmitter facilities of WPXN, as well as six other New York City television stations and several radio stations, were destroyed when two hijacked airplanes crashed into and destroyed the World Trade Center towers. The next day, the Federal Communications Commission (FCC) authorized W23BA to temporarily move its signal to channel 31, boost its power to 240 kW, and change its call letters to W31CK to replace WPXN's signal. When WPXN-TV returned to the air with a new transmitter on the Empire State Building in 2002, W31CK's signal moved back to channel 34 and was assigned W34CP as its new call letters. A year later, the station became WPXO-LP.

In August 2007, WPXO was sold to Caribevision Station Group, LLC. It re-launched on September 11, 2007, as an affiliate of new network CaribeVision. The station's programming consisted mainly of Argentinian and Brazilian telenovelas (Yago, pasión morena, Mi primer amor -originally known in Argentina as Romeo y Julieta-, etc.), talk shows (Margarita, te voy a contar), sitcoms (Here's Lucy, Poné a Francella), infomercials during the mornings and public domain cartoons on weekends.

During the week of May 4, 2009, WPXO-LP turned off its analog signal on channel 34 and began test broadcasts on digital channel 34, and as of late May, WPXO has been transmitting its programming full-time on digital channel 34.

On July 31, 2012, the CaribeVision network was dissolved and the station became a charter affiliate of MundoFox, which started broadcasting the next day; to provide full-market coverage of the station, it was also simulcast on Fox Television Stations-owned WWOR-DT4. The station was added to Cablevision Verizon Fios and Time Warner Cable. The network was renamed MundoMax in 2015 after Fox left the network's partnership; FTS ended the simulcast on WWOR-DT4 shortly thereafter.

WPXO-LD's affiliation with MundoMax ended on August 1, 2016. At that time, América Tevé, which had been seen on the station's second digital subchannel, was moved to WPXO's primary channel. MundoMax did not have an affiliate in New York for the last four months of the network's existence; the network ceased operations on November 30, 2016.

The station was licensed to move its signal to digital channel 4 (the former analog channel allocation of WNBC) effective September 6, 2017.

Digital television

References

External links

PXO-LD
PXO-LD
Television channels and stations established in 1993
PXO-LD
PXO-LD
Low-power television stations in the United States
1993 establishments in New Jersey